State Route 111 (SR-111) is a state highway in the U.S state of Utah that runs north–south across the west side of the Salt Lake Valley in Salt Lake County. It is known as 8400 West and Bacchus Highway throughout the route's course, in respect of north to south.

Prior to 1969, SR-111 extended past SR-209 (then SR-48) and passed through Herriman before terminating at SR-71.

Route description
The route begins at a junction with SR-209 on the rural western end of West Jordan, near Copperton. It continues north as a two-lane road and curves northwest past its junction with 7800 South. The highway widens to four lanes by the time 5400 West terminates on the road. Past 5400 West, SR-111 turns north and passes the ghost town of Bacchus, where there is currently an industrial presence. SR-111 continues into Magna and cuts a path through the center of the town before terminating at SR-201, an expressway/freeway that connects the west-central fringes of the county to Salt Lake City.

Between the intersection of 5400 South and 4100 South, a brake check area is provided to northbound traffic.

The entire route is included as part of the National Highway System.

History
The state legislature created State Route 111 in 1931, running west from SR-71 in Draper to SR-68 in Riverton. State Route 159, added in 1933, continued west from Riverton through Herriman to Lark and then turned north along the Oquirrh foothills to U.S. Route 50 (US-50), present-day SR-171 (3500 South), near Magna. The two routes were combined as SR-111 in 1945, and in 1957 the east end was extended north along 700 East, which had been SR-71, to 7700 South north of Sandy, only to be truncated back to Draper in 1959 when SR-71 was again restored there. In 1962, the northern terminus of SR-111 was extended north slightly from 3500 South (by then SR-171) to US-50 Alternate (now SR-201). The final change was a major truncation in 1969, moving the south end of SR-111 to its present location near Copperton, at the New Bingham Highway (SR-48 until 2015, SR-209 since). The portion of old SR-111 from SR-68 in Riverton to SR-71 in Draper became an extension of SR-71, but the remainder was removed from the state highway system.

Major intersections

References

111
 111